The Sacramento Surge was a professional American football team that played in the World League of American Football (WLAF) in 1991 and 1992. The team played its first season at Hughes Stadium in Sacramento, and the second season in Hornet Stadium on the Sacramento State University campus.  It was owned by Managing General Partner Fred Anderson and the General Manager was Michael F. Keller. In charge of Special Projects was Jack Youngblood, who also partnered with Joe Starkey and Ronnie Lott on Surge radio broadcasts on Sacramento radio station KRAK.

The team was coached by former Buffalo Bills quarterback–head coach Kay Stephenson. Charlie Sumner was the defensive coordinator and Jim Haslett was a defensive assistant coach.

The Surge won the World Bowl in 1992, the only American team to do so. On this championship team were future professional wrestler Bill Goldberg and investment guru Pete Najarian.

After the WLAF ended its American presence at the end of the 1992 season, Anderson continued Sacramento's presence in professional football by acquiring a Canadian Football League expansion franchise. The new team was named the Sacramento Gold Miners; Stephenson and several Surge players were retained in the change, as were the team colors of aqua and yellow.

As of April 2021, it is planned to revive the "Surge" franchise as "Stuttgart Surge" in the newly established "European League of Football" which sees itself as a continuation of WLAF and NFL Europe.

Season-by-season

1991 season

Personnel

Staff

Roster

Schedule

1992 season

Personnel

Staff

Roster

Schedule

References

External links
 1991 Sacramento Surge stats on FootballDB.com
 1991 Sacramento Surge stats on FootballDB.com

 
NFL Europe (WLAF) teams
American football teams established in 1991
Sports clubs disestablished in 1992
American football teams in Sacramento, California
Defunct American football teams in California
1991 establishments in California
1992 disestablishments in California